Mouhssin Chehibi (born 28 January 1978 in Tetuan) is a former Moroccan middle distance runner who specialized in the 800 metres.

His personal best time over the distance is 1:44.16 minutes, achieved in July 2006 in Athens.

International competitions

References

External links
 

1978 births
Living people
People from Tétouan
Moroccan male middle-distance runners
Olympic athletes of Morocco
Athletes (track and field) at the 2000 Summer Olympics
Athletes (track and field) at the 2004 Summer Olympics
Athletes (track and field) at the 2008 Summer Olympics
World Athletics Championships athletes for Morocco
20th-century Moroccan people
21st-century Moroccan people